Alison Elliott (born May 19, 1970) is an American actress. She was nominated for a Screen Actors Guild Award for the 1997 film The Wings of the Dove. Her other film appearances include The Spitfire Grill (1996), Birth (2004), The Assassination of Jesse James by the Coward Robert Ford (2007) and 20th Century Women (2016).

Early life
Elliott was born in San Francisco, California, the daughter of Barbara, a teacher of nursing, and Bob Elliott, a computer executive. She moved with her family to Tokyo, Japan, when she was four years old, and moved back to San Francisco when she was eight, where she later attended the Urban School of San Francisco, an independent arts high school.

Career
At 14, Elliott began her modeling career with Ford Models, and in 1989, she moved to Los Angeles to star as a teen-aged model on the TV sitcom Living Dolls (1989).

Elliott is known for the films The Underneath (1995), The Spitfire Grill (1996), The Wings of the Dove (1997) (for which she received a SAG Awards nomination), The Miracle Worker (2000), and Birth (2004).  She also portrayed Virginia "Jinny" St. George in the BBC mini-series production of Edith Wharton's The Buccaneers (1995).

In 2007's critically acclaimed western The Assassination of Jesse James by the Coward Robert Ford, Elliott appeared alongside Brad Pitt, Casey Affleck, Sam Rockwell and Paul Schneider in the role of Martha Bolton, the older sister of Robert Ford.

In addition to her film and television roles, Elliott has narrated multiple audio books, including Belle Prater's Boy by Ruth White and its sequel, The Search for Belle Prater.

Filmography

Film

Television

References

External links
 

Living people
20th-century American actresses
21st-century American actresses
American film actresses
American television actresses
Actresses from San Francisco
1970 births